North by South is a 2016 album by American bluegrass musician Claire Lynch. It peaked at number five on the Bluegrass Albums chart, and earned Lynch a Grammy Award nomination for Best Bluegrass Album.

Track listing

Personnel
Alison Brown - Guitar
Jerry Douglas - Dobro
Stuart Duncan - Fiddle
Béla Fleck - Banjo
David Grier - Guitar
Claire Lynch - Guitar, Vocals
Kenny Malone - Percussion
Bryan McDowell - Banjo, fiddle, guitar, mandolin, tenor banjo, vocals
Mark Schatz - Bass, jaw harp
Jeff Taylor - Accordion
Jarrod Walker - Guitar, mandolin, vocal harmony
Matt Wingate - Guitar, vocal harmony

References

2016 albums
Claire Lynch albums
Bluegrass albums